The Baby Snakes were an Irish rock band formed in 1985. The original line-up featured Frank Rynne, Niall O'Sullivan and Johnny Bonney. In October 1985 they recorded a radio session for Dave Fanning's RTÉ radio show and reached No. 13 in Fanning's Fab 50, an end-of-year listeners poll, in December 1985. Their first L.P., Sweet Hunger, featured Brian Downey from  Thin Lizzy on drums. Their second L.P. was produced by Dave Goodman. In 1988, after a BBC Radio 1 session for Janice Long, the band moved to London with new drummer Stephen R Kennedy [now a hydro engineer in France] who previously played in a band headed by Noel Phelan (now a house DJ) where they played a mix of underground venues as well as The Marquee.

Discography
 Song "Johnny" - Various Artists - Weird Weird World of Guru Weirdbrain LP - Hotwire Records - HWLP8505 - IRL - 1985
Songs for Subliminal Kids EP 7" - Santides Records - SAN 0057 - IRL – 1987
This City Sucks (live) - Cassette FOAD Records - ??? - January 1988
Sweet Hunger LP FOAD Records - FOAD 7 - June 1988 Produced by Ian Bryon and Paul Thomas.
Rebel Radio LP - Santides Records - SAN0089 - July 1990 Produced by Dave Goodman
Looking for Strange (Cassette) - Santides, 1990
Four Foot Tapping Greats EP 7" - Santides Records - SUE 66 - UK - 1992 Four Johnny Cash covers, 2 recorded in mono.

References

External links
The Baby Snakes "Fade" on Anything Goes, RTE, 1984
The Baby Snakes "Looking for Strange" on Megamix, RTE, 1987
 Profile of The Baby Snakes'

Irish rock music groups
Musical groups established in 1985
1985 establishments in Ireland